Lynwood is a rural locality located in the Northern Rivers Region of New South Wales. It had a population of 228 in the 2016 census.

References 

Towns in New South Wales
Northern Rivers